HLS may refer to:

Organisations
 Harlington Locomotive Society, London, England
 HealthSouth, a former American hospital operator
 Huntingdon Life Sciences, a British contract research organisation
 HLS Ost, German WWII cryptanalysis station

Education
 Harvard Law School, Cambridge, Massachusetts, US
 Helen Lowry Higher Secondary School, Mizoram, India
 Highlands Latin School, Louisville, Kentucky, US

Events
 Himalayan Languages Symposium, an annual academic conference on Trans-Himalayan languages

Technology
 HTTP Live Streaming, a media streaming communications protocol
 HLS color space, a representation of points in an RGB color model
 High-level synthesis, an automated design process

Transportation
 Human Landing System, a NASA program to choose a Moon landing system for the 2020s
 Starship Human Landing System, a modified version of the SpaceX Starship
 Heavy Logistics System, a USAF program to develop the Lockheed C-5 Galaxy
 Lockheed C-5 Galaxy, the winner of the USAF HLS project
 Haiti Air Freight (ICAO airline code HLS); see List of defunct airlines of Haiti
 St Helens Airport (IATA airport code HLS), Tasmania, Australia
 Hilsea railway station (station code HLS), England, UK

Other uses
 Historical Dictionary of Switzerland (German: Historisches Lexikon der Schweiz)

See also

 Health and life sciences; see health sciences and life sciences

 HL (disambiguation)
 HIS (disambiguation)